Albatrellus confluens is a species of fungus in the family Albatrellaceae. It is commonly referred to as fused polypore. It is similar to ovinus, but bitter and with age tend to salmon color.

Description
The top of the cap is a white to whitish-grey/brown, depending on age. The pores attach to the underside of the cap and continue partway down the stipe. When heated, the mushroom can become a green-yellow color.

This mushroom also produces Grifolin, an anticancer molecule.

The species is inedible.

See also
 Albatrellus subrubescens

References

External links
 
 
 

Russulales
Fungi described in 1805
Inedible fungi
Taxa named by Johannes Baptista von Albertini
Taxa named by Lewis David de Schweinitz